is a Japanese male volleyball player from Yokohama city in Kanagawa Prefecture. He plays in V.League Division 1 for Wolf Dogs Nagoya and Japan men's national volleyball team.

Career 
Tomohiro started to play volleyball because of his sister when he was in the third year of elementary school.
In the second year of high school, in "All Japan Junior Star Dream Match" tournament, his performance caught the eye of Yoshiteru Okazaki, who was the director of the Meiji University volleyball club at that time. Then, he entered the Meiji University and played for the university's volleyball club.

In the third year of the college, he won the Best Libero award in the fall league match. In the fourth year, he became the captain and led the team finished at the third place. Moreover, he was also called "The guardian deity of Meiji University" for the achievements.

In 2018, Tomohiro was called for Japan U-23 national team, competing in 2018 Asian Men's Volleyball Cup. At the end, Japanese team finished at third place and he received the Best Libero award.

In 2019, he had the name in Japan universiade national team for 2019 Summer Universiade Tournament which was held in Naples – Italy, the team ended up at fifth place and he received the Best Digger award. In the same year, Tomohiro transferred to Wolf Dogs Nagoya and played in V.League Division 1.

In 2021, he was called for Japan senior national team for the first time and had the name in 2021 FIVB Volleyball Men's Nations League Japanese roster.

Awards

Individual 
 2018 Asian Men's Volleyball Cup — Best Libero
 2019 Summer Universiade Tournament — Best Digger
 2020-21 V. League — Best Libero
 2020-21 V. League — Serve Receive Award, with serve receive success rate 73.2%

References 

1996 births
Living people
Japanese men's volleyball players
Sportspeople from Kanagawa Prefecture
Meiji University alumni
Liberos
21st-century Japanese people